Eleanor Marie of Anhalt-Bernburg (7 August 1600 in Amberg – 17 July 1657 in Strelitz) was a princess of Anhalt-Bernburg by birth and by marriage Duchess of Mecklenburg-Güstrow.

Early life 
Eleanor Marie was a daughter of Prince Christian I (1568-1639) from his marriage to Anna of Bentheim-Tecklenburg (1579-1624), the daughter of Count Arnold III of Bentheim-Tecklenburg-Steinfurt-Limburg.

Biography 

On 7 May 1626 in Güstrow, she married Duke John Albert II of Mecklenburg-Güstrow (1590-1636).  After his death, she took up regency for her young son Gustav Adolph, as specified in her husband's testament.  However, only three days later, her brother-in-law Adolf Frederick I deposed her as regent and guardian of her son and took up those rôles himself.  This caused a bitter dispute between Eleonore Marie and her brother-in-law.  However, on 4 May 1636, the estates submitted to Adolf Frederick I.

Adolf Frederick appealed against his brother's testament, and replaced all but one of the cabinet members in Güstrow, leaving only Andreas Buggenhagen in office.  He also took measures against the Reformed Church in Mecklneburg-Güstrow.  In 1637, he separated Gustav Adolph from his Calvinist mother.  Nobody dared to participate in the private Calvinist services Eleonore Marie organized, and she was referred to hew window seat in Strelitz.  Emperor Ferdinand III ruled in her favor.  However, Adolf Frederick continued his court cases against her, and involved foreign powers into the matter.

Eleonore Marie finally renounced her rights in 1645.  She died twelve years later on her widow seat in Strelitz.  She was buried in the Cathedral in Güstrow.

Issue 
From her marriage to John Albert II, she had the following children:
 Anna Sophie (29 September, 1628 — 10 February 1666), married Duke Louis IV of Legnica
 John Christian (1629–1631)
 Eleanor (1630–1631)
 Gustav Adolph (1633–1695)
 Louise (20 May 1635 — 6 January 1648)

References 
 J. S. Ersch: Allgemeine Encyklopädie der Wissenschaften und Künste, section 2, p. 118, Brockhaus, Leipzig, 1842 Online
 Eduard Vehse: Geschichte der deutschen Höfe seit der Reformation, vol. 35-36, Hamburg, 1856, p. 130 ff

Footnotes 

House of Ascania
German duchesses
1600 births
1657 deaths
17th-century German people
Daughters of monarchs